Cape Naturaliste, in the south west of Western Australia, is the site of a lighthouse which was activated in 1904.

The light characteristic is "Fl. Another precious lens optic is displayed there, the second order Fresnel lens of the Jarman Island Light, as well as the original Great Sandy Islands beacon. Both items were originally used on the Pilbara coast further north.

The lighthouse was constructed of limestone quarried from nearby Bunker Bay, which was also known as the "Quarries".

See also

 List of lighthouses in Australia

Notes

References

Lighthouses in Western Australia
Cape Naturaliste, Western Australia
Lighthouse museums in Australia
Museums in Western Australia
Leeuwin-Naturaliste National Park
Lighthouses completed in 1904
State Register of Heritage Places in the City of Busselton